Silvia Njirić (born 9 July 1993) is a Croatian tennis player.

Having already played in Fed Cup for Croatia, Njirić made semifinals at the 2010 Junior French Open, losing to Elina Svitolina.

She has won seven singles and 14 doubles titles on the ITF Circuit. On 4 May 2015, she reached her best singles ranking of world No. 370. On 23 July 2012, she peaked at No. 290 in the doubles rankings.

ITF Circuit finals

Singles: 12 (7 titles, 5 runner–ups)

Doubles: 25 (14 titles, 11 runner–ups)

Junior Grand Slam finals

Girls' doubles: 2 runner–ups

Fed Cup participation

Singles

Doubles

References

External links
 
 
 

1993 births
Croatian female tennis players
Tennis players from Zagreb
Living people